Bernd Leno (born 4 March 1992) is a German professional footballer who plays as a goalkeeper for  club Fulham and the Germany national team.

Club career

VfB Stuttgart

Having progressed through the youth set up at VfB Stuttgart, in May 2011, Leno extended his contract until June 2014. By this time he was a regular goalkeeper in the VfB Stuttgart II reserve team who played in the German Third Division.

Bayer Leverkusen

On 10 August 2011, he was loaned out to Bayer Leverkusen until 31 December 2011. Four days after the five months loan deal was signed, Leno made his Bundesliga debut against Werder Bremen. He became, after Dirk Krüssenberg and Heribert Macherey, the third goalkeeper in Bundesliga history to keep a clean sheet in his first three Bundesliga games. When he played on 13 September 2011, at the age of 19 years and 193 days, against Chelsea in the 2011–12 UEFA Champions League group stage he became the youngest German goalkeeper to ever to play in a Champions League match.

The transfer was made permanent on 30 November 2011, when Leno received a deal that kept him with Bayer until 2017. Leno became a regular in the first team and after a string of impressive performances, on 8 November 2013, he signed an improved contract to keep him at the club until 2018. He made his 300th competitive appearance for Leverkusen on 14 April 2018 in a 4–1 league win over Eintracht Frankfurt.

Arsenal
On 19 June 2018, Premier League club Arsenal announced that Leno had signed a five-year contract for a fee of £22.5 million, while pending 'the completion of regulatory processes'.

Leno made his debut for Arsenal in the 4–2 victory over Vorskla Poltava in the Europa League. Leno made his Premier League debut in the 2–0 home victory over Watford, replacing regular goalkeeper Petr Čech, who picked up an injury in the first-half. His performance was praised by head-coach Unai Emery, who said "He is working very well with the goalkeeping coaches. I spoke with him and said the most important thing is when the team needs him to help us, to be prepared. He did that on Wednesday and today also – and against Vorskla. We have three very good goalkeepers. Petr Čech, his performances for us have been very important and his experience. Leno can learn by staying near with Petr Čech every day. I am very happy with him. He has waited for his moment and it's arriving."

Leno was the runner up of the Arsenal Player of the Season award in the 2019–20 season, commanding 16 per cent of the final vote. On 25 February 2021, he played his 100th match for Arsenal in all competitions in a 3–2 win over Benfica in the Europa League round of 32.

Leno was relegated to a backup in the 2021–22 season after the signing of Aaron Ramsdale, who was selected as the starting goalkeeper.

Fulham
On 2 August 2022, Leno transferred permanently to Fulham on a three-year contract with an option to extend by a further 12 months, for a reported £8m fee. He made his Cottagers debut on 20 August in the 3–2 win against West London rivals Brentford. His first clean sheet came in Fulham's 3–0 win against Aston Villa on 20 October. The result led to Steven Gerrard's dismissal as Villa manager.

International career
Leno received his first call up to the senior Germany team in October 2015 for UEFA Euro 2016 qualifiers against Republic of Ireland and Georgia. He was later included in his nation's squad for the final tournament the following summer.

Leno was selected for the 2017 FIFA Confederations Cup in Russia. He played one game of the tournament, against Australia. He was named in Germany's provisional squad for the 2018 FIFA World Cup, but was not selected for the final 23-man squad. On 19 May 2021, he was selected to the squad for the UEFA Euro 2020.

Media
Leno was involved in the Amazon Original sports docuseries All or Nothing: Arsenal, which documented the club by spending time with the coaching staff and players behind the scenes both on and off the field throughout their 2021–22 season.

Personal life
Leno was born in Bietigheim-Bissingen, Baden-Württemberg. His father is Russian-German.

On 11 August 2020, Leno married his long-time girlfriend, Sophie Christin.

Career statistics

Club

International

Honours
Arsenal
FA Community Shield: 2020
UEFA Europa League runner-up: 2018–19

Germany U17
UEFA European Under-17 Championship: 2009

Germany
FIFA Confederations Cup: 2017

References

External links

Profile at the Fulham F.C. website
Profile at the Premier League website

1992 births
Living people
People from Bietigheim-Bissingen
Sportspeople from Stuttgart (region)
German people of Russian descent
Footballers from Baden-Württemberg
German footballers
Germany youth international footballers
Germany under-21 international footballers
Germany international footballers
Association football goalkeepers
VfB Stuttgart players
VfB Stuttgart II players
Bayer 04 Leverkusen players
Arsenal F.C. players
Fulham F.C. players
3. Liga players
Bundesliga players
Premier League players
UEFA Euro 2016 players
2017 FIFA Confederations Cup players
UEFA Euro 2020 players
FIFA Confederations Cup-winning players
German expatriate footballers
Expatriate footballers in England
German expatriate sportspeople in England